No One Is Talking About This is the debut novel by American poet Patricia Lockwood, published in 2021. It was a finalist for the 2021 Booker Prize, was one of the New York Times''' 10 best books of 2021, and won the 2022 Dylan Thomas Prize.

The novel focuses on a woman who is always online. Her life changes focus after her family experiences an unexpected tragedy.

 Development and publication 
Riverhead Books published No One Is Talking About This in February 2021. It was simultaneously released by Bloomsbury in the UK, where it was the subject of a 10-way auction, and was commissioned for translation in more than a dozen languages. Lockwood composed the novel from 2017, after the publication of her memoir, Priestdaddy, through early 2020, working mostly on an iPhone. The book began as a diary written in the third person. Excerpts appeared in The New Yorker and the London Review of Books.

In 2018 Lockwood delivered a lecture titled “How Do We Write Now?” for Oregon-based publisher Tin House. The essay addressed the effect of internet exposure on the creative process. No One Is Talking About This fleshes out some of the thinking of that essay.

 Content and style 
The book is in two parts. It follows an unnamed protagonist's interactions with a virtual platform called "the portal” and uses stream of consciousness and other modernist, poetic, and experimental techniques. Its first half does not have a traditional plot. In Harper's, the critic Christian Lorentzen referred to the novel's style as "virtual realism." The second half, which Lockwood said is autofictional, presents a family tragedy and explores concepts of grief, perception, consciousness, and permanence.

Reception
The novel was released to acclaim and spawned numerous critical and cultural discussions. It was one of the most widely reviewed English-language books of 2021, according to review aggregator Book Marks.

Writing for The New York Review of Books, Clair Wills praised the novel as "an arch descendant of Austen's socio-literary style — a novel of observation, crossed with a memoir of a family crisis, and written as a prose poem, steeped in metaphor." In The Seattle Times Emma Levy compared its structure and narrative style to William Faulkner's The Sound and the Fury, while Molly Young of New York magazine drew parallels to Vladimir Nabokov, "less in style than in attitude, one of extraordinary receptivity to the gifts, sorrows, and bloopers of existence."

"Lockwood has set out to portray not merely a mind through language, as Joyce did," wrote Alexandra Schwartz of The New Yorker, "but what she calls 'the mind,' the molting collective consciousness that has melded with her protagonist's singular one." For The Chicago Tribune, John Warner observed: “She has made a novel out of life, just as Joyce did over a century ago,” likening the book favorably to Ulysses.

In a mixed review for the Los Angeles Times, Hillary Kelly wrote that No One Is Talking About This is "either a work of genius or an exasperating endurance trial," comparing it to the novels of Virginia Woolf: "The Waves is masterful, but there's a reason we read Mrs. Dalloway far more." Lockwood's book itself makes direct reference to Woolf's To the Lighthouse, with which it shares a number of aesthetic and ontological concerns.

Charlotte Goddu of Vanity Fair said: "The feeling one gets from reading No One Is Talking About This is that Lockwood has paid attention more closely than perhaps any other human on earth to what it's like to be alive right now." NPR's Heller McAlpin called it "a tour de force that recalls Joan Didion's ... Slouching Towards Bethlehem."

Ron Charles of The Washington Post dubbed Lockwood "a master of startling concision when highlighting the absurdities we've grown too lazy to notice" and the book "a vertiginous experience, gorgeously rendered but utterly devastating." In the New York Times, Joumana Khatib wrote that No One Is Talking About This "explores the kind of tumult and grief that almost defies language," while Merve Emre for The New York Times Book Review observed it "transforms all that is ugly and cheap about online culture ... into an experience of sublimity." The Wall Street Journal's Emily Bobrow called the novel "artful" and "an intimate and moving portrait of love and grief." The Boston Globe praised the book's "sublime emotional power."

For The Atlantic, Jordan Kisner found No One Is Talking About This "electric with tenderness" and "a grand success." In Bookforum, Audrey Wollen called it "a stunning record of the hollows and wonders of language itself." The Guardian, The Telegraph, and The New Statesman all heralded the book as a "masterpiece."

The Booker Prizes called it a "sincere and delightfully profane love letter to the infinite scroll, and a meditation on love, language and human connection."

"The book’s triumph is in evoking so full a range of emotional discovery and maturing within the unpromising medium of online prattle," said Booker judge Rowan Williams. "We’re left wondering about the processes by which language expands to cope with the expansiveness of changing human relations and perceptions at the edge of extremity."

Awards and honorsNo One Is Talking About This won the 2022 Dylan Thomas Prize and was a finalist for other major awards, including the Booker Prize and the Women's Prize for Fiction. The New York Times named it one of the 10 Best Books of 2021, and it appeared on more books of the year lists than any other novel of 2021, including for the Washington Post, TIME, NPR, the Telegraph, the Times, and the Guardian'', among others.

References 

2021 American novels
2021 debut novels
Novels about the Internet
Riverhead Books books
Literature by women
Novels about social media